Dali railway station is a railway station located in Dali, Dali Bai Autonomous Prefecture, Yunnan, China. It opened in 1999.

History
The first EMU service to Dali railway station began on 1 July 2018. Dali–Ruili railway opened on 22 July 2022.

References 

Railway stations in Yunnan
Railway stations in China opened in 1999